The Kawgun Cave (also spelt Kawgon Cave or Kawgoon Cave) is a Buddhist cave temple, located in , Hpa-An, Kayin State, Myanmar. The cave is lined with thousands of small Buddha statues covering its walls. The cave is an important historical and cultural heritage site in Myanmar. The rear of the cave leads to a row of floating restaurants in the Ruby Lake.

Location
The Kawgun Cave is located eight miles from Hpa-an, 28 miles from Mawlamyine, and two miles from the west bank of Thanlwin River. Located at the foot of Mt. Kawgun, the cave is 130 feet long, 70 feet wide, and 25 feet high. Mt. Kawgun is 60,000 feet long from northeast to southwest, and the highest point is 10,000 feet high.

History

The Kawgun Cave is a limestone cave. The origins of the cave temple are not clear. It is believed to have been constructed around the 7th century, but historian Nai Maung Toe has speculated, on the basis of its inscriptions, that the site might date as far back as the 6th or 7th century. The first known Western visitor to the cave was John Crawfurd in January 1827.

Three stone reliefs were found in the Kawgun Cave, two of which are related to Buddhism, and the other one is related to Hinduism. One of the Buddhist reliefs has 23 lines of the ancient Mon script carved on the left side of the statue's robe. The right side of the robe is already broken and only 3 lines remain. In addition to the depictions of Brahma, Vishnu and Shiva in the Hindu stone reliefs, there is also an image of Ganesh. The Kawgun Cave has stone and ink inscriptions that can supplement the historical evidence. The ink inscription stated the names of the donors and their wishes, as well as the number of Buddha images they donated. According to the stone inscription that is written in the ancient Mon script, some Buddha statues were donated by a queen consort of Martaban. When King Anawrahta of Pagan conquered Thaton Kingdom and took King Manuha to Pagan, the queen consort of Martaban escaped. It is said that she hid in the Cave and donated Buddha statues there.

The cultural heritage in Kawgun Cave is being maintained by the Ministry of Culture with technology and protected by laws.

References 

Buddhist caves in Myanmar
Buildings and structures in Kayin State